from the NTT Device Technology Laboratories, Kanagawa, Japan was named Fellow of the Institute of Electrical and Electronics Engineers (IEEE) in 2016 for contributions to heterogeneous integration of semiconductor lasers.

References

Fellow Members of the IEEE
Living people
Year of birth missing (living people)
Place of birth missing (living people)